Jodi Beth Black is an American microbiologist and research administrator serving as deputy director of the Office of Extramural Research at the National Institutes of Health. She was previously the director and vice president of research administration at the Translational Genomics Research Institute and the acting director of the division of extramural activities at the National Heart, Lung, and Blood Institute.

Education 
Jodi Black earned a Bachelor of Arts in biology at Rollins College. She completed a Ph.D. in experimental pathology and Masters of Medical Science in infectious diseases at Emory University. Her dissertation was titled Human herpesvirus 6 strain Z29: Growth characteristics, virion specific protein identification and the effect of infection on the host. Her doctoral advisor was Philip E. Pellett.

Career and research 
Black was a research microbiologist at the Centers for Disease Control and Prevention (CDC), where she served as the head for the CDC Cellular Virology Lab in the Herpes Virus section. She joined the National Institutes of Health (NIH) as a program officer and director of the Office of the AIDS Malignancy Program at the National Cancer Institute.

From 2005 through 2009 she served as director and vice president of research administration at the Translational Genomics Research Institute.

Black later worked as the acting director of the National Heart, Lung, and Blood Institute (NHLBI) Division of Extramural Research Activities. At NHLBI, she led and managed the institute's extramural research and training programs. She established several trans-NIH programs to support the development and transition of NIH-supported research technologies to the private sector, and to increase and expedite the translation of basic science discoveries into new diagnostics, devices, treatments, and patient services.

In 2016, Black became the deputy director of the NIH Office of Extramural Research (OER). She leads and supports development of initiatives, program and grants management policy and processes, and the small business and extramural technology development programs.

In her career, Black has developed, implemented, and managed large, diverse, multidisciplinary scientific programs in areas including infectious diseases, cancer and genomics and has developed strategic alliances between academic, healthcare and commercial organizations to leverage resources and capacity across institutions to enhance the translation of innovative technologies from the bench to the market to enhance health.

Selected works

References 

Living people
Year of birth missing (living people)
Place of birth missing (living people)
National Institutes of Health people
21st-century American biologists
21st-century American women scientists
American medical researchers
Women medical researchers
American women biologists
20th-century American women scientists
20th-century American biologists
American microbiologists
Women microbiologists
Medical administrators
Rollins College alumni
Emory University alumni
Centers for Disease Control and Prevention people